Qidār (also Romanized as Qīdar, Qidar; also known as Geydar, Ghaidar, Keydar, Kedar, Geydār Palnamnār, Ghaidar Paighambar, Keydar-Peygambar, and Qidār Peyghāmbar) is a city in the Central District of Khodabandeh County, Zanjan province, Iran, and serves as capital of the county.

At the 2006 census, its population was 25,525 in 6,253 households. The following census in 2011 counted 30,251 people in 7,997 households. The latest census in 2016 showed a population of 34,921 people in 10,028 households.

Azerbaijani is the native language of the city. Qeydar is also well known for its agriculture. Khodabandeh County was the birthplace of Sheikh Shahabaddin Sohravardi.

Tourist attractions 
The saint Qedar's tomb and Katale Khor caves are the most visited tourist attractions of Khodabandeh County.

References 

Khodabandeh County

Cities in Zanjan Province

Populated places in Zanjan Province

Populated places in Khodabandeh County